PakWheels Auto Show is a series of annual auto shows organized by PakWheels for the automobile enthusiasts of Pakistan. The initiative was started in 2011 from Lahore. and since then PakWheels has been organizing these shows in different cities of Pakistan in an effort to create awareness about the automobile industry and encourage automotive culture in the country.



History

2011

Lahore 
Owing to the stagnant automobile industry in Pakistan and lack of auto shows in the country, PakWheels took the initiative to arrange an auto show in its home city Lahore on Pakistan Day in 2011 to promote the automotive culture and to provide a platform for the automotive enthusiasts to gather, discuss and showcase their rides at the center of the city. The show featured many exotics, tuners and luxury sports cars. The show was a hit and it was the biggest gathering of car enthusiasts in the city.

2012

Lahore 
After getting an overwhelming response from the first auto show, PakWheels organized another auto show the following year on 25 March in collaboration with TDCP. The show was attended by thousands of people including car lovers. The Lahore Auto Show 2012 was also supported by the Government of Punjab. Government support leveled the playing field for PakWheels to start a series of similar auto shows all around the country.

Islamabad 
In November 2012, PakWheels took its auto show from Lahore to the Capital of Pakistan and arranged the biggest gathering of automobile lovers of the city. The show had a display of more than 500 exclusive cars and it was attended by thousands of people. The Islamabad Auto show was the first auto show which PakWheels organized outside its home city.

2013

Lahore 
The 2013 Lahore Auto Show was bigger and better than the shows of preceding years. With the support from Government and TDCP, PakWheels managed to turn what started as an enthusiasts' gathering into official auto show of the city. The 2013 Lahore Auto Show not only featured tuners or exotics, but also featured vintage and timeless classics from 1950s and 1960s era.

Karachi 
In September 2013, PakWheels brought its signature event to the City of Lights. The Karachi Auto Show 2013 was the first auto show of this scale in Karachi. The highlights of the show include new cars from the automakers of the country, vintage cars, imported exotic and tuner cars, superbikes and a special Ferrari 2012 Formula 1 model car

Islamabad 
The Islamabad Auto Show 2013 was organized as a two-day auto festival which had a display of cars as well as a Go Kart Racing competition to increase the awareness about motorsports in Pakistan as well as to discourage illegal street racing in the country. The number of people attending this event increased ten folds compared to the auto show from last year.

2014

Lahore 
The Lahore Auto Show 2014 was held on March 16 at Liberty Roundabout. The 2014 Auto Show was dedicated to creating awareness and raising funds for Shaukat Khanum Memorial Cancer Hospital and Research Centre, Peshawar. The show was attended by many renowned celebrities, government officials and enthusiasts for the love of cars and for the noble cause.

Karachi 
Karachi Auto Show 2014 was held at the Karachi Expo Center where all the major exhibitions are held. The number of people who visited the show quadrupled from the previous year owing to the increasing popularity of these shows in Pakistan. The show was a major success and was attended by major automotive celebrities of Pakistan including Nadir Magsi, Nadeem Khan, Ronnie Patel and Mohsin Ikram.

Islamabad 
On November 23, 2014 PakWheels organized the 3rd Annual Auto Show of Islamabad. The event had a participation of hundreds of cars and thousands of people. Each year the show gets bigger and better with more participation and involvement of the local auto community of the city.

2015

Multan 
PakWheels' aim for 2015 is to bring the autoshow to more cities of Pakistan and the year started with a new city. On February 8, 2015, PakWheels arranged the first ever autoshow in the city of Multan. The show was the first of its show that the city of Multan has ever witnessed and it was attended by senior political figures and automobiles celebrities of Pakistan.

Lahore 

On March 23, 2015 PakWheels arranged the 2nd show of 2015 and the 5th Annual Auto Show of Lahore which was attended by a large crowd who came to see the numerous exotic cars and bikes in real life. The show also featured a life size replica of Shell Formula 1 car specially brought in from Italy. A number of celebrity car enthusiasts such as superstar Ali Zafar also visited the show. The show concluded at the day end with a closing award ceremony in which the founder of PakWheels handed over shields and appreciated the volunteers of the show.

Multan

References

External links
 PakWheels official website
 PakWheels Auto Show official website

Automotive industry in Pakistan
Entertainment events in Pakistan
Auto shows
Auto shows in Pakistan
2011 establishments in Pakistan